The Tomorrowpeople (1996-2000) were a psychedelic rock band based in Dallas, TX, featuring former members of Brutal Juice and Toadies.

They took their name from a cult British science fiction show (The Tomorrow People) that aired on ITV in the early '70s.

During their career, The Tomorrowpeople played and toured with such groups as Tripping Daisy, Spoon, Centro-matic, Sixteen Deluxe and Third Eye Blind.

The group's Gordon Gibson, Ben Burt and Jody Powerchurch reformed in 2008 with two new members, Gary Parks and Hayes Smith, ostensibly to promote the release of their catalog on iTunes.

Their reunion show was on May 17, 2008 at the Double-Wide in Dallas, TX.
The song "Dying Breed" was used in the documentary about Rick Kirkahm called TV Junkie.

History
Gordon Gibson formed The Tomorrowpeople in 1996 with his roommate Erich Scholz in Denton, TX while on a break from touring with Brutal Juice. Following a move to Dallas, the two hooked up with former New Bohemian guitarist Wes Martin who brought them into Steve Curry's SRC Studios in Garland, TX. Along with Brutal Juice drummer Ben Burt, the group—with Martin on bass—recorded a clutch of songs that would come to be known as Scuzzy Ports. Although never released, the eight-track demo soon attracted the attention of major labels on the West Coast. Enlisting the aid of recently departed Toadies guitarist Darrel Herbert and Chomsky keyboardist John Norris, Gibson and Scholz—who took the nom de rock "Jody Powerchurch"—quickly wrote enough songs for a set and played their first show at Club Dada in Dallas on November 18, 1996.

Their wildly erratic stage shows featured liberal use of old 16mm films and projections courtesy of Gordon and Jody's neighbor Michael Allen as well as live deployment of electronics and samples.

The group signed with Geffen Records, home of Nirvana, Sonic Youth and Beck, in 1998 and recorded an album's worth of material with former Brave Combo and Tripping Daisy drummer Mitch Marine. However a shift in power at the label resulted in the group departing Geffen before the album was mastered.

Following the departure of Ben Burt, Bill Shupp officially took over drumming chores. Multi-instrumentalist Don Cento was recruited when Herbert and Norris left in 1999. For the group's 2008 incarnation, musicians Gary Parks and Hayes Smith came aboard on guitar and bass, respectively.

The group released two CDs, 1997's Golden Energy on Last Beat/Slab records and 1999's Marijuana Beach—a mini album of demos and unreleased tracks from their aborted 1998 Geffen set. Several other songs have appeared on compilations and promos. In 2008 they released their catalog on iTunes, Rhapsody, Napster, Yahoo and Amazon and issued a third official album, Bounced and Renounced which as of this writing is exclusively available as a download.

Band members
 Gordon Gibson - lead vocals, guitar, programming
 Jody Powerchurch (ne Erich Scholz) - guitar, bass
 Ben Burt - drums
 Darrel Herbert - bass, guitar
 John Norris - keyboards, vocals
 Bill Shupp - drums, vocals
 Don Cento - guitar, keyboards
 Michael Allen - lights, visuals

Discography
Albums
Golden Energy (Last Beat/Slab Recordings, 1997)
Marijuana Beach (Olivia Records, 1999)
Bounced and Renounced (Olivia Records, 2008)

External links
Is There Another Tomorrow for the Tomorrowpeople? DC9 at Night 5/20/08 

Psychedelic rock music groups from Texas